The E. H. Moore Research Article Prize, also called the Moore Prize, is one of twenty-two prizes given out by the American Mathematical Society (AMS). It recognizes an outstanding research article to have appeared in one of the AMS primary research journals during the previous six years. The prize was created in 2002 in memory of the former AMS president E. H. Moore. It is awarded every three years at the Joint Mathematics Meetings and carries a cash reward of $5,000.

Recipients 
 2004 Mark Haiman for "Hilbert schemes, polygraphs, and the Macdonald positivity conjecture", J. Amer. Math. Soc. (2001)
 2007 Ivan Shestakov and Ualbai Umirbaev for "The tame and the wild automorphisms of polynomial rings in three variables," J. Amer. Math. Soc. (2004) and "Poisson brackets and two-generated subalgebras of rings of polynomials," J. Amer. Math. Soc. (2004)
 2010 Sorin Popa for "On the superrigidity of malleable actions with spectral gap," J. Amer. Math. Soc. (2008)
 2013 Michael J. Larsen and Richard Pink for "Finite subgroups of algebraic group," J. Amer. Math. Soc. (2011)
 2016 Caucher Birkar, Paolo Cascini, Christopher Hacon, and James McKernan for "Existence of minimal models for varieties of log general type," J. Amer. Math. Soc. (2010)
 2019 Ciprian Manolescu for "Pin(2)-equivariant Seiberg–Witten Floer homology and the triangulation conjecture," J. Amer. Math. Soc. (2016)
 2022 Piotr Przytycki and Daniel Wise for "Mixed 3-manifolds are virtually special," J. Amer. Math. Soc. (2018)

See also

 List of mathematics awards

References

Awards of the American Mathematical Society
American science and technology awards
International awards